Zenpuku-ji (善福寺), also known as Azabu-san (麻布山), is a Jōdo Shinshū temple located in the Azabu district of Tokyo, Japan. It is one of the oldest Tokyo temples, after Asakusa.

History
Founded by Kūkai in 824, Zenpuku-ji was originally a Shingon temple. Shinran visited the temple during the Kamakura period and brought the temple into the Jodo Shinshu sect.

Under the 1859 Treaty of Amity and Commerce, the first Tokyo legation of the United States of America was established at Zenpuku-ji under Consul-General Townsend Harris.

Features
 There is a monument to Townsend Harris and the First American Legation in Tokyo.
 A 750-year-old ginkgo tree at the entry to the cemetery, purportedly planted by Shinran and called "the upside down tree" (the largest ginkgo in Tokyo today), is a registered National Natural Monument
 A well in the approach to the shrine is supposed to have been struck by Kukai's bishop's staff.  This well served the community during the Great Kantō earthquake and the Great Tokyo Air Raid.

People associated with Zenpukuji
 Henry Heusken, attacked by rōnin at Nakanohashi on January 14, 1861, was brought back to Zenpukuji to die. The funeral procession from there to nearby Korinji was a critical confrontation between the bakufu and the foreign legations.
 Masuda Takashi, founder of Mitsui, served as an interpreter there at the age of 14.

Notable interments
 Fukuzawa Yukichi, founder of Keio University

See also 
 For an explanation of terms concerning Japanese Buddhism, Japanese Buddhist art, and Japanese Buddhist temple architecture, see the Glossary of Japanese Buddhism.

References

External links
 
 

Religious organizations established in the 9th century
Buddhist temples in Tokyo
Buildings and structures in Minato, Tokyo
Buildings and structures in Japan destroyed during World War II
9th-century establishments in Japan
Jōdo Shin temples
Religious buildings and structures completed in 824